Wolves is the seventh studio album by Miss Li, released in 2013. The album was released in North America on 11 May 2014. A double album, its first disc features material written solely by Miss Li and producer Sonny Boy Gustafsson, while the second disc comprises cover versions of songs by other artists.

Track listing

Charts

References

2013 albums
Miss Li albums